Lodi station may refer to:

Lodi railway station (Lombardy), a railway station in Lodi, Lombardy, Italy
Lodi T.I.B.B. (Milan Metro), a metro station in Milan, Italy
Lodi (Rome Metro), a metro station in Rome
Lodi Transit Station, in Lodi, California, USA

Other uses
Lodi (disambiguation)